ATP-dependent RNA helicase DDX42 is an enzyme that in humans is encoded by the DDX42 gene.

Function 

This gene encodes a member of the Asp-Glu-Ala-Asp (DEAD) box protein family. Members of this protein family are putative RNA helicases, and are implicated in a number of cellular processes involving alteration of RNA secondary structure such as translation initiation, nuclear and mitochondrial splicing, and ribosome and spliceosome assembly. Members of this family are believed to be involved in embryogenesis, spermatogenesis, and cellular growth and division. Two transcript variants encoding the same protein have been identified for this gene.

Interactions 

DDX42 has been shown to interact with SF3B1.

Model organisms
Model organisms have been used in the study of DDX42 function. A conditional knockout mouse line called Ddx42tm1b(EUCOMM)Wtsi was generated at the Wellcome Trust Sanger Institute. Male and female animals underwent a standardized phenotypic screen to determine the effects of deletion. Additional screens performed: - In-depth immunological phenotyping

References

Further reading